Silvano Levy is an academic and art critic specialising in surrealism. He has published on Belgian surrealism with studies on René Magritte, E.L.T. Mesens and Paul Nougé. His research on The Surrealist Group in England began with a film on Conroy Maddox and the book Conroy Maddox: Surreal Enigmas (1995), while a wider interest in the movement led to the publication of Surrealism: Surrealist Visuality (1997) and Surrealism (2000). Levy has curated national touring exhibitions of the work of Maddox and Desmond Morris, and has published a monograph on the latter entitled Desmond Morris: 50 Years of Surrealism (1997), which was followed by the enlarged re-edition Desmond Morris: Naked Surrealism (1999). Subsequent books on Morris include Lines of Thought: The Drawings of Desmond Morris (2008) and two volumes (2000 & 2012) of an analytical catalogue raisonné spanning eight decades. Silvano Levy's monograph on Maddox, The Scandalous Eye. The Surrealism of Conroy Maddox, was published by Liverpool University Press in 2003. 2015 saw the publication of Decoding Magritte. Further studies cover Sheila Legge, Dalla Husband, Toni del Renzio, André Breton, Dina Lenković, Jean-Martin Charcot and Birmingham surrealism. Dr Levy is editor of Surrealist Bulletin and has held academic posts at the University of Liverpool, Newcastle Polytechnic, the University of Bath, the University of Hull and Keele University, where he was promoted to Senior Lecturer in French in 1998 and then to Reader in 2005.HE

Bibliography 
AUTHORED BOOKS
 (2020) Desmond Morris Late Work Analytical Catalogue Raisonné 2012-2020 (Sansom & Co., Bristol), Hardback , Paperback , 288 pp. 1-288
 (2015) Decoding Magritte (Sansom & Co., Bristol) , 280 pp. 1–280
 (2014) Sheila Legge Phantom of Surrealism (Dark Windows Press, Rhos-on-Sea) , 114 pp. 1–114
 (2012) Desmond Morris Analytical Catalogue Raisonné 2000–2012 (Redcliffe Press, Bristol), Standard Edition , Collector's edition , 312 pp. 1–312
 (2008) Dina Lenković (Vlastito Izdanje, Zagreb) , 160 pp. 1–160
 (2008) Lines of Thought. The Drawings of Desmond Morris (Kettlestone Press, Norfolk) , 200 pp. 1–200
 (2003) The Scandalous Eye: The Surrealism of Conroy Maddox (Liverpool University Press) , 292 pp. 1–292
 (2002) Desmond Morris, translation of Desmond Morris: Naked Surrealism with a foreword by Willy Van den Bussche (Petraco Pandora, Antwerp/Museum Voor Moderne Kunst, Ostend) , 87 pp. 11–464
 (2001) Desmond Morris: Analytical Catalogue Raisonné 1944–2000 (Petraco Pandora, Antwerp) , 464 pp. 1–464
 (1999) Desmond Morris: Naked Surrealism (Petraco Pandora, Antwerp) , 240 pp. 1–240, augmented re-edition in Belgium of Desmond Morris: 50 Years of Surrealism
 (1997) Desmond Morris: 50 Years of Surrealism (Barrie and Jenkins, Ebury Press, London) , 224 pp. 1–224
 (1994, 2002) Understanding French Accounts (Pitman, London, Pearson Educational, London) , 151 pp. 1–151

AUTHORED SHORT BOOKS

 (2012) Desmond Morris Pintura (Instituto Superior de Psicologia Aplicada, Instituto Universitário, Lisbon), 8 pp. not paginated
 (2005) 'La psique al desnudo: La obra de Desmond Morris' in desmond morris pintor surrealista (Guillermo de Osma Galería, Madrid) [Depósito legal M-37.070-2005], 21 pp. 1–21
 (2001) Conroy Maddox: A Surrealist Odyssey (Belgrave Gallery Publishing, London) , 16 pp. 1–16
 (2000) Surrealism (Vade Mecum, Hereford) , 20 pp. 1–20
 (1997) Desmond Morris: A Surrealist World (Buxton Museum & Art Gallery) , 7 pp. 1–7
 (1996) Desmond Morris: 50 Years of Surrealism (Stoke City Museum and Art Gallery) , 16 pp. 1–16

EDITED COLLECTIONS

 (2013) (journal editor) Surrealist Bulletin IV: Arturo Schwarz (Kettlestone Press, Norfolk) , 16 pp. 1–16
 (2011) (journal editor) Surrealist Bulletin III: Patrick Hughes (Kettlestone Press, Norfolk) , 16 pp. 1–16
 with PIRSIG-MARSHALL, T. (2009) British Surrealism in Context. A Collector's Eye (Leeds Museums and Galleries), 223 pp. 1–223
 (2007) (journal editor) Surrealist Bulletin II: Desmond Morris (Belgrave Gallery, London) , 16 pp. 1–16
 (2006) (journal editor) Surrealist Bulletin I: Toni del Renzio (Sherwin & Northern Artists Galleries, Leeds) , 16 pp. 1–16
 (1997) Surrealism: Surrealist Visuality (New York University Press) [Hardback , Paperback ], 173 pp. 1–173
 (1996, 1997) Surrealism: Surrealist Visuality (Keele University Press) [Hardback 1996 , Paperback 1997 ], 173 pp. 1–173
 (1995) Conroy Maddox: Surreal Enigmas (Keele University Press) , 190 pp. 1–190
 (1994, 2002 a) (series editor) Donaghy, P. & Laidler, J., Understanding Spanish Accounts (Pitman, Pearson Educational, London) 
 (1994, 2002 b) (series editor) Höffgen, A. & Duncalf-Edelsbacher, J., Understanding German Accounts (Pitman, Pearson Educational, London) 

CHAPTERS IN BOOKS / ONLINE SCHOLARLY PUBLICATIONS

 (2021) Dalla Husband’s Contribution to Atelier 17 in E. Gaffney (Ed.), Art Herstory (28 September 2021) https://artherstory.net/dalla-husbands-contribution-to-atelier-17/

(2020) La Douce insurrection des poèmes de Desmond Morris/Gentle Mutiny: The Poems of Desmond Morris in M. REMY (Ed.) Desmond Morris À Tue-Tête. Headworks (Les Éditions du Grand Tamanoir, Caen, 2020), 11 pp. 7-17
(2020) Sheila Legge. Pork Chop or Not in I. PFEIFFER (Ed.), Fantastic Women. Surreal Worlds from Meret Oppenheim to Freda Kahlo (Schirn Kunsthalle Frankfurt, Frankfurt, 2020) , 4 pp. 125-128
 (2014) Attività del Gruppo Surrealista in Gran Bretagna 1936–2008 in A. SCHWARZ (Ed.), Il Surrealismo, ieri e oggi . Storia, filosofia, politica (Skira Rizzoli, New York, 2014) , 46 pp. 213–258
 (2009) Toni del Renzio: Surrealist Champion or Antagonist? in S. LEVY & T. PIRSIG-MARSHALL, T. (Eds), British Surrealism in Context. A Collector's Eye (Leeds Museums and Galleries, 2009), 9 pp. 59–67
 (2007) Paul Nougé Constructing Absence in P. ALLMER & H. VAN GELDER (Eds), Collective Invention: Belgian Surrealism Reconsidered (LGC-Series, Leuven University Press, 2007) , 13pp. 70–82
 (2004) Menace. Surrealist Interference of Space in T. MICAL (Ed.) Surrealism and Architecture (Routledge, London, 2004) , 21 pp. 60–80
 (2000) Maddox, the Melvilles and Morris: Birmingham Surrealists in T. SIDEY (Ed.) Surrealism in Birmingham 1935 1954  (Birmingham Museums and Art Gallery, 2000) , 14 pp. 23 36
 (2000) André Breton and the Belgian Connection in R. FOTIADE (Ed.) André Breton – The Power of Language (Elm Bank Publications, Exeter, 2000) , 13 pp. 125–137
 (1996 a) René Magritte: Representational Iconoclasm in S. LEVY (Ed.) Surrealism: Surrealist Visuality (Keele University Press, 1996) , 15 pp. 15–29
 (1996 b) Introduction in S. LEVY (Ed.) Surrealism: Surrealist Visuality (Keele University Press, 1996) , 4 pp. 7–10
 (1995 a) Dangerous Cities in S. LEVY (Ed.) Conroy Maddox: Surreal Enigmas (Keele University Press, 1995) , 2 pp. 181–2
 (1995 b) In pursuit of Enigma: 1935–1940 in S. LEVY (Ed.) Conroy Maddox: Surreal Enigmas (Keele University Press, 1995) , 6 pp. 7–12

PEER REVIEWED JOURNALS

(July 2012), pp. 53–62
 (2007) Toni del Renzio in extremis: Alter Ego and Doppelganger, The Papers of Surrealism 
 (2005) Magritte at the Edge of Codes, Image & Narrative Online Magazine of Visual Narrative , Issue 13 The Forgotten Surrealists: Belgian Surrealism Since 1924 (November 2005), University of Leuven.
 (2005) The del Renzio Affair: A leadership struggle in wartime surrealism, The Papers of Surrealism AHRC Research Centre for Studies of Surrealism and its Legacies , Issue 3, 34 pp. 1–34.http://www.surrealismcentre.ac.uk/papersofsurrealism/journal3/acrobat_files/Levy_article.pdf
 (2001) Jean-Martin Charcot, une source du surréalisme au dix-neuvième siècle, Pleine Marge , No. 34, 16 pp. 175–191
 (1997) Surrealism, the Scientist and Sex, Art Review , Vol. XLIX, 2 pp. 64–5
 KELLY, B., LEVY, S. (1996) Music: An Accessory to the Crime. Paul Nougé and Surrealist Music, Aura , 20 pp. 97–116
 (1995) An Unholy Mission, Modern Painters , Vol. 8, No. 1, 3 pp. 61–63
 KELLY, B., LEVY, S. (1994) E.L.T. Mesens' Renouncement of Music, French Studies Bulletin , No. 52, 3 pp. 13–15
 (1994) Paul Nougé and Surreal Invention, New Comparison , No. 17, 15 pp. 120–134
 (1993 a) Magritte, Mesens and Dada, Aura , No. 1, 11 pp. 31 41
 (1993 b) Magritte: The Uncanny and the Image, French Studies Bulletin , No. 46, 3 pp. 15 17
 (1992 a) Magritte and Words, Journal of European Studies , Vol. 22, Part 4, No. 88, 19 pp. 313 321
 (1992 b) Magritte and the Surrealist Image, Apollo , Vol. CXXXVI, No. 366, 3 pp 117 119
 (1990) Foucault on Magritte on Resemblance, Modern Language Review , Vol. 85, No.1, 7 pp. 50 56
 (1987) Some Views on Metaphor: From Classical Rhetoric to Robbe Grillet, The Linguist , Vol. XXVI, No. 2, 3 pp. 66 68
 (1986) Linguistic Principles and Iconic Communication, Journal of Literary Semantics , Vol. XV, No. 3, 11 pp. 216 226
 (1985) From Language Loss to the Poetic Function, The Linguist , Vol. XXIV, No. 1, 4 pp. 45 48
 (1981) René Magritte and Window Display, Artscribe International , No. 28, 5 pp. 24 28

OTHER ARTICLES AND SHORT TEXTS

 (2021) 'The recurring theme ...' in Modern British and Irish Art Day Sale (Christie's, London, 21 October 2021), 1 p. online https://www.christies.com/lot/lot-6340357?ldp_breadcrumb=back&intObjectID=6340357&from=salessummary&lid=1

 (2021) 'Conroy Maddox' in The Mind’s Eye: Surrealist Sale (Bonham’s, London, 25 March 2021), 1 p. 130

 (2021) 'John Banting' in The Mind’s Eye: Surrealist Sale (Bonham’s, London, 25 March 2021), 1 p. 122

 (2019) 'Jeffrey Sherwin: Medic, Politician, Collector' in Outside In: The Dr Jeffrey Sherwin Collection (Christie’s, London, 21 November 2019), 1 p. 6
 (2019) 'This work belongs to a major phase...' in Modern Made (Lyon & Turnbull, London, 27 March 2019), 1 p. 113
 (2018) 'In 1967 Desmond Morris...' in Design and Modern Art (Mallams, Oxford, 6 & 7 December 2018), 1 p. 132
 (2017) 'Conroy Maddox (1912–2005) Anthropomorphic Landscape' in Modern British and Irish Art (Christie's, London, 27 June 2017), 1 p. 157
 (2016) 'Conroy Maddox (1912–2005) Conquest of the Irrational' in Modern/British Art Online (Christie's, London, 2 October 2016), 1 p.
 (2016) 'NPG x196215: Conroy Maddox', National Portrait Gallery website
 (2013) 'Conroy Maddox (1912–2005) The Terminus' in Modern British and Irish Art (Christie's, London, 16 October 2013), 1 p. 75
 (2013) 'Conroy Maddox (1912–2005) Cabinet des Merveilles; and Threatening Beetle' in Interiors (Christie's, London, 13 August 2013), 1 p. 46
 (2012) 'Conroy Maddox (British, 1912–2005) Departure of the Wayfarer, 1940' in 20th Century Art & Design (Mallams, Oxford, 12 December 2012), 1 p. 88
 (2012) 'Conroy Maddox (British, 1912–2005) On the Borderlands, 1937' in 20th Century Art & Design (Mallams, Oxford, 12 December 2012), 1 p. 88
 (2012) 'Conroy Maddox (1912–2005) The Treasure Trail, Mythical Figures' in Modern British and Irish Art (Christie's, London (14 December 2012), 1 p. 31
 (2012) 'Conroy Maddox (1912–2005) Flag Waving, Organic Threads' in 20th Century British Art (Christie's, London, 12 July 2012), 1 p. 34
 (2012) 'Conroy Maddox (1912–2005) Untitled' in 20th Century Art & Design (Mallams, Oxford, 23 May 2012), 1 p. 107
 (2011) 'Conroy Maddox (1912–2005) Atmospherics, Rendezvous' in 20th Century British Art (Christie's, London, 15 December 2011), 1 p. 52
 (2011) 'Conroy Maddox (1912–2005) Threatening Beetle' in 20th Century British Art (Christie's, London, 14 July 2011), 1 p. 58
 (2011) 'Leonora Carrington. Surrealist Painter and Sculptor who Found her Artistic and Spiritual Home in Mexico', The Independent , No. 7,684, 28 May 2011, 2 pp. 44–45
 (2009) 'The Second World War…' in 20th British Art (Christie's, London, 16 December 2009), 1 p. 42
 (2009) 'Seeing Blindness' in Open Windows an Exhibition of Surrealist Artworks by Patrick Hourihan (Gallery West-Eleven, London, 6–12 July 2009), 2 pp. 2–3
 (2008) 'Conroy Maddox (1912–2005)' in 20th British Art (Christie's, London, 16 July 2008), 1 p. 58
 (2008) 'Desmond Morris' in 20th British Art (Sotheby's, London, 18 March 2008), 1 p. 106
 (2008) 'Conroy Maddox' in 20th British Art (Sotheby's, London, 18 March 2008), 1 p. 111
 (2007) 'Conroy Maddox (1912–2005) The Stillness of the Day' in 20th British Art (Christie's, London, 27 June 2007), 1 p. 50
 (2007) 'Toni del Renzio Surrealist Artist', Yorkshire Post , 20 January 2007, 1 p. 10
 (2007) 'Toni del Renzio Enfant Terrible of English Surrealism', The Independent , No. 6,315, 12 January 2007, 1 p. 41
 (2006) 'Conroy Maddox (1912–2005) The Engaged Couple' in 20th Century British Art (Bonham's, London, 28 November 2006), 2 pp. 8–9
 (2006) 'Freud and Sculpture: Frozen Dynamism', catalogue supplement, Freud's Sculpture, Henry Moore Institute, Leeds, 2006, 10 pp. 1–10
 (2006) 'Conroy Maddox (1912–2005) The Stillness of the Day' in The Poetry of Crisis. The Peter Nahum Collection of British Surrealist and Avant-Garde Art 1930–1951 (Christie's, London, 15 November 2006), 1 p. 42
 (2006) 'Desmond Morris (B. 1928) Comparative Anatomy' in The Poetry of Crisis. The Peter Nahum Collection of British Surrealist and Avant-Garde Art 1930–1951 (Christie's, London, 15 November 2006), 1 p. 58
 (2006) 'Desmond Morris (B. 1928) Cat VI (Two Cats)' in The Poetry of Crisis. The Peter Nahum Collection of British Surrealist and Avant-Garde Art 1930–1951 (Christie's, London, 15 November 2006), 1 p. 58
 (2006) 'Desmond Morris (B. 1928) Entry to a Landscape' in The Poetry of Crisis. The Peter Nahum Collection of British Surrealist and Avant-Garde Art 1930–1951 (Christie's, London, 15 November 2006), 1 p. 59
 (2005) 'Is it the real Desmond Morris?', Desmond Morris. Surrealist Paintings (1949–2004), Alexander Clayton Art, Stratford upon Avon, 2005, 1 p. 1
 (2005) 'Magician Maddox Conjured up Surreal', The Birmingham Post, No. 45,081, 8 February 2005, 1 p. 9
 (2005) 'Conroy Maddox', The Times , No. 68,286, 17 January 2005, 1 p. 50
 (1999) 'Conroy Maddox English Surrealist', Conroy Maddox an English Surrealist (Mercer Art Gallery, Harrogate, 1999, 6 pp. 1–6
 (1997) 'Conroy Maddox The Surrealist Eye', Conroy Maddox The Surrealist Eye (The Market House, Ledbury, 1997), 1 p. 1
 (1994) 'Conroy Maddox: Commitment to Enigma', Conroy Maddox: Paintings and Objects (Gallery M, London, 1994), 3 pp. 2–4
 (1993) 'Marcel Mariën', The Independent , No. 2,170, 2 October 1993, 1 p. 45
 (1992) 'This is a Magritte', The Times Higher Education Supplement , No. 1,028, 17 July 1992, 1 p. 18
 (1984) 'Waterloo Script and the French Conventions of Letter Writing', University College Dublin Computer Centre Newsletter, Vol. 11, No. 1 (including program), 2 pp. 19–20

ARTICLES IN EDITED COLLECTIONS

 (2009) Maddox, Conroy Ronald (1912–2005), in Lawrence Goldman (Ed.) Oxford Dictionary of National Biography 2005–2008 (Oxford University Press, Oxford, 2013) , 2 pp. 739–740; online edition,  (Oxford University Press, January 2009) 
 KELLY, B., LEVY, S. (2001) Mesens, Edouard Léon Théodore in S. SADIE (Ed.) The New Grove Dictionary of Music and Musicians, second edition, Vol. 16,  (Macmillan, London) , 1 p. 479
 (1998 a) Le Surréalisme de Desmond Morris, in E. BURSSENS (Ed.) Scope 99 (Editions Labor, Brussels, Editions Martial, Paris) , 1 p. 408
 (1998 b) Het Surrealisme van Desmond Morris, in E. BURSSENS (Ed.) Snoecks 99 (Snoeck-Ducaju & Zoon, Ghent) , 1 p. 454
 (1995 a) Antigone: Play by Jean Anouilh, 1944 in L. HENDERSON (Ed.) Reference Guide to World Literature (St James Press, Detroit) , 2 pp. 43–4
 (1995 b) The Outsider (L'Etranger): Novel by Albert Camus, 1942 in L. HENDERSON (Ed.) Reference Guide to World Literature (St James Press, Detroit) , 2 pp. 225–6
 (1995 c) The Fall (La Chute): Novel by Albert Camus, 1956 in L. HENDERSON (Ed.) Reference Guide to World Literature (St James Press, Detroit) , 1 p. 225

Papers 
 2023 ‘René Magritte and Belgian Surrealism’, Osher Institute, University of California San Diego 
 2019 ‘Conflict in the Wake of Surrealexeter 1967’, University of Exeter
 2018 ‘Surrealist Biological Distortion’, St. Hugh’s College, Oxford
 2017 'Conroy Maddox: Outside In Inside Out’, Aberystwyth University
 2016 'Magritte the Saboteur', Waterstones, Piccadilly, London
 2014 'Surrealism and the Street', Barber Institute, University of Birmingham
 2014 'Surrealism', Abbot Hall Art Gallery, Kendal
 2012 'Biomorphism as Ethology', Instituto Superior de Psicologia Aplicada, Instituto Universitário, Lisbon
 2012 'Lewis Carroll and British Surrealism', Tate Liverpool
 2012 'Biomorphism or Skeuomorphism: Surrealist distortion', University of Hull
 2011  'Magritte's La Saveur des larmes', Tate Liverpool
 2011 'Magritte. Le Refus de l'authentique', Le Centre Interdisciplinaire Récits Cultures Psychanalyse Langues et Sociétés de l'Université de Nice
 2010  'Surrealism: the Ultimate Defiance', National Gallery of Scotland, Edinburgh
 2010 'Surrealism', National Association of Decorative and Fine Arts Societies, Harrogate
 2009 'Desmond Morris', University of Cambridge
 2009 'Surrealism in Britain', University of Cambridge
 2009 'Fleeting Phantom: Sheila Legge', Centre for Research in the Arts, Social Sciences and Humanities, University of Cambridge
 2009 'What is Surrealism?', Leeds Art Gallery
 2009 'Paul Nougé Constructing Absence', French Institute, Edinburgh
 2008 'Surrealism: Anger and Revolt', University of Durham
 2008 'Desmond Morris. Lines of Thought', Williamson Art Gallery and Museum, Birkenhead
 2008 'Reading Magritte's La Saveur des larmes', The Barber Institute, University of Birmingham
 2006 'Body Language: Communication and Identity', University of the Arts, Bremen
 2005 'Magritte at the Edge of Codes', Conception Reception, Annual Conference, The Association of Art Historians, University of Bristol
 2003 'Conroy Maddox', Chelsea Arts Club, London
 2003 'Chasing Dreams: Freud and the Surrealists', University of Manchester
 2002 'La Lumière de l'inconscient', Université catholique de l'Ouest, Angers
 2002 'Surrealism', City Art Gallery, Southampton
 2001 'The Surrealism of Maddox and Morris', Birmingham Museum and Art Gallery
 2001 'Jean-Martin Charcot, a nineteenth-century influence', Le Surréalisme appartient-il au XXe siècle?, St. Hugh's College, Oxford
 1998 'Psychoanalysis and the Surrealist Object', Identities, Annual Conference, The Association of Art Historians, University of Exeter
 1997 'Surrealism and Desmond Morris', Charleston Literary Festival
 1997 'Surrealism: an introduction', Ledbury Poetry Festival
 1997 'Desmond Morris and Surrealism', Buxton Museum & Art Gallery
 1997 'Edouard Mesens et la persistance du dadaïsme', La Littérature et les arts en Belgique francophone, University of Edinburgh
 1997 'Sex and Surrealism', Whitworth Art Gallery, University of Manchester
 1996 'René Magritte: The Space in Question', Research Seminar, Keele University
 1996 'The Unknown Desmond Morris', City Museum and Art Gallery, Stoke-on-Trent
 1996 'André Breton and the Belgian Connection', André Breton: The Power of Language, International Surrealist Colloquium, University of Glasgow
 1995 'Conroy Maddox: The Philosophy of a Surrealist', Leeds City Art Gallery
 1994 'Belgian Surrealist Theories of music', University of Reading (with Barbara Kelly)
 1993 'Paul Nougé and Surrealist Music', Centre for Research in French Studies, University of Keele (with Barbara Kelly)
 1993 Interview with Conroy Maddox, Surrealism: The Scene of the Crime, Eugène Vinaver International Colloquium University of Manchester
 1993 'Dangerous Music: Belgian Theories of Musical Surrealism', The Scene of the Crime Colloquium, University of Manchester (with Barbara Kelly)
 1993 'Belgian Surrealist Theories of Music', University of Liverpool (with Barbara Kelly)
 1992 Panellist at Dissecting the exquisite corpse: Surrealism in Words and Images, Symposium, Institute of Romance Studies, University of London
 1989 'The Theories of Paul Nougé', North-West, Universities' Seminar in French, University of Liverpool
 1988 'Aspects of the Belgian Approach to Surrealism', University of Newcastle upon Tyne
 1987 'Art Déco', Newcastle Polytechnic
 1987 'Jean Cocteau', Tyneside Cinema, Newcastle upon Tyne
 1987 'Surrealism on Film: The Movement and its Philosophy', series of three lectures, Merseyside Film Institute, Liverpool
 1985 'The Paris 1920 Style', University of Liverpool
 1985 'Jean Cocteau', Merseyside Film Institute, Liverpool
 1984 'The Language of Literary Criticism: Structuralism and the Narrative', University College, Dublin
 1984 'Dada and Surrealism', Trinity College, Dublin
 1984 'Paul Nougé', University of Liverpool
 1983 'Belgian Surrealism', National College of Art and Design, Dublin
 1983 'Language Loss: A Linguistic Approach', Dublin Dyslexia Association
 1983 'The Theory of Abstraction', National Institute for Higher Education, Dublin
 1982 'Aphasic Models', University of Kent
 1982 'Abstraction, Problems of Interpretation', University of Kent
 1982 'René Magritte', Trinity College, Dublin

Media 
 2022 Contributor Any Answers?, BBC Radio 4, 30 April 2022, 2.00-3.00 pm.
 2020 Expert guest The Sadeq Show, Iran International Television, 11 June 2020, 3.00 pm.
 2020 Live contributor Alfie and Anna at Breakfast, BBC Radio Newcastle, 20 March 2020, 7.00-10.00 am.
 2007  Live contributor Ronnie Barbour, BBC Three Counties Radio, 9 March 2007, 5.00–6.00 pm.
 2007 Contributor Brief Lives, BBC Radio 5 Live, 18 February 2007, 6.00–6.30 am.
 2006 Live contributor Breakfast, BBC Radio Stoke, 21 September 2006, 7.45–8.00 am.
 2005 Contributor Front Row, BBC Radio 4, 14 January 2005, 7.15–7.45 pm.
 2002 Live contributor The Late Show, BBC Radio Nottingham, 30 October 2002, 10.30–11.00 pm.
 2002 Contributor Brugse Radio VBRO (Belgium) 106 FM, 25 March-3 April 2002
 2002 Live contributor Morning Show, Saga Radio, 1 February 2002, 10.30 am.
 2000 Live contributor Night Waves, BBC Radio 3, 8 December 2000, 10.00–10.30 pm.
 2000 Contributor Front Row, BBC Radio 4, 4 December 2000, 7.15–7.45 pm.
 1996 Contributor Answers Back: Desmond Morris, BBC Radio Scotland
 1995 Director, author & narrator Conroy Maddox: Surreal Enigmas, 16 minutes
 1995 Contributor Performance, BBC Radio Stoke
 1991 Contributor Mind Your Own Business, BBC Radio Stoke
 1987 Interpreting for live stage performance by Antonio Fava, Commedia dell'arte
 1986 Script translator Briefing: The Swiss Connection, Independent Television, 4 December 1986

References

Bibliography
 Leslie Ross, Language in the Visual Arts: The Interplay of Text and Imagery (Jefferson: McFarland & Co Inc., 2014), p. 192, Endnote 15
 Gary Shapiro, Archaeologies of Vision: Foucault and Nietzsche on Seeing and Saying (University of Chicago Press, 2003), p. 425, Endnote 22
 Joseph J. Tanke, Foucault's Philosophy of Art: A Genealogy of Modernity (London, New York: Continnuum-3PL, 2009), Chapter 3, Endnote 8

General

External links

 University of Hull, School of Languages, Linguistics & Cultures

British art critics
Alumni of the University of Reading
Alumni of the University of Kent
Living people
20th-century births
Year of birth missing (living people)